Nadeș is a commune in Mureș County, Transylvania, Romania. It is composed of four villages: Măgheruș (Küküllőmagyarós), Nadeș, Pipea (Pipe) and Țigmandru (Cikmántor).

See also
List of Hungarian exonyms (Mureș County)

References

Communes in Mureș County
Localities in Transylvania